This is a list of years in Turkey. See also the timeline of Turkish history.  For only articles about years in Turkey that have been written, see :Category:Years in Turkey.

21st century

20th century

See also
Years in the Ottoman Empire
Timeline of Turkish history
Timeline of Istanbul
Timeline of Ankara
Timeline of Bursa

 
Turkey history-related lists
Turkey